Fruit Fly is a 2009 musical film with gay and Asian-American themes, directed by H.P. Mendoza, who wrote the screenplay for Colma The Musical (2007). The film, made entirely in San Francisco, premiered on March 15, 2009 at the San Francisco International Asian American Film Festival at the Castro Theatre in San Francisco. It had a limited one-week run in New York on September 24, 2010.

Plot
Fruit Fly is a musical comedy about Bethesda, a Filipina performance artist finding home in the unlikeliest places. She moves into an artist commune in an attempt to workshop her latest piece which deals with finding her biological mother. In the process, she finds an artistic family, clues of her mother's whereabouts, and the startling possibility that she just might be a fag-hag.

Subplots include her relationship with her roommates in the artist commune, and their relationships with each other.

Cast
 L. A. Renigen as Bethesda
Ivan de Guzman as himself
Mike Curtis
Aaron Zaragoza
E.S. Park
Theresa Navarro
Christian Cagigal
Don Wood
Michelle Talgarow
H.P. Mendoza
Christina Augello

Awards
 Best Narrative Feature - Audience Award - San Francisco International Asian American Film Festival
 Best Overall Film - Fort Worth LGBT Film Festival
 Rising Star Award - Philadelphia International Gay & Lesbian Film Festival

History
During the festival life of Colma: The Musical, Mendoza and actress L.A. Renigen would jump back and forth from gay film festival to Asian film festival for about a year.  After experiencing the strange treatment Renigen would receive from gay men (automatically labeling her as a "fag hag"), he decided to create Bethesda, a character based on Renigen.  Bethesda, like Renigen, is a performance artist who moves to San Francisco to workshop her latest performance piece dealing with finding her biological mother.  Also like Renigen, Bethesda finds herself going to gay bars every night and getting labeled a "fag hag".  The musical film, called "irresistible" by the San Francisco Chronicle was funded by the Center for Asian American Media and was awarded the Best Narrative Feature Audience Award at the 2009 San Francisco International Asian American Film Festival.

Screenings
 San Francisco International Asian American Film Festival - Centerpiece
 Outfest - Four in Focus
 Frameline
 Boston LGBT Film Festival - Closing Night
 Silk Screen Asian American Film Festival
 Seattle International Film Festival
 Fort Worth LGBT Film Festival - Opening Night
 Philadelphia International Gay & Lesbian Film Festival - Centerpiece
 New York Asian Film Festival - Closing Night
 Rhode Island International Film Festival
 Vancouver Queer Film Festival
 Fresno LGBT Film Festival
 Savannah LGBT Film Festival
 Southwest Gay and Lesbian Film Festival
 Toronto Reel Asian International Film Festival
 San Diego Asian Film Festival
 Milwaukee LGBT Film & Video Festival
 Hawaii International Film Festival
 Montreal LGBT Film Festival
 Chicago LGBT International Film Festival
 Austin Asian American Film Festival
 Rehoboth Independent Film Festival
 Hong Kong LGBT Film Festival

References

External links
 
 
 
 "Fruit Fly": H.P. Mendoza's last musical - San Francisco Chronicle
 "The buzz on H.P. Mendoza's Fruit Fly" - SF360

2009 films
2000s English-language films
2000s musical comedy films
American LGBT-related films
American musical comedy films
Comedy films about Asian Americans
Films shot in San Francisco
Films about Filipino Americans
American independent films
LGBT culture in San Francisco
LGBT-related musical films
2009 directorial debut films
2009 comedy films
Asian-American LGBT-related films
Asian-American musical films
2009 LGBT-related films
2000s American films